The 2000 Grand American Road Racing Championship was the inaugural season of the Rolex Sports Car Series run by the Grand American Road Racing Association.  The season involved five classes: Sports Racing Prototypes I and II (SR-I and SR-II) and three Grand Touring classes referred to as GTO, GTU, and AGT.  9 races were run from February 5, 2000 to August 17, 2000.

The Grand American Road Racing Championship officially replaced the brief United States Road Racing Championship which had folded during their 1999 season.  The Grand American series used similar rules, although the class names were all changed.

Schedule

† - Two separate individual races were held for the GT classes and SR classes for an equal distance.

Results 
Overall winners in bold.

† - Two separate individual races were held for the GT classes and SR classes for an equal distance.

References

External links
 The official website of Grand-Am
 World Sports Racing Prototypes - Rolex Sports Car Series 2000 results

Rolex Sports Car Series
Grand American Road Racing